Tula is a census-designated place and unincorporated community in Lafayette County, Mississippi, United States.

Tula is a name either (sources vary) derived from the Chickasaw language meaning "rock", or a transfer from Tula, in Russia.

It was first named as a CDP in the 2020 Census which listed a population of 197.

History
Tula was the location of the Tula Normal Institute and Business College.

It was once believed that Tula was a site of petroleum deposits. Two experimental oil wells existed in 1962, but like many wells in the Lafayette County area they were abandoned before significant investments were made. There were many oil prospects in northern Mississippi which quickly ran dry, causing a large majority of investors to view the Tula wells with caution.

Demographics

2020 census

Note: the US Census treats Hispanic/Latino as an ethnic category. This table excludes Latinos from the racial categories and assigns them to a separate category. Hispanics/Latinos can be of any race.

Arts and culture
The Tula Opry is a bluegrass musical located in Tula.

Education
It is in the Lafayette County School District.

Notable people
 Larry Brown, author.
 Henry L. Davis, former member of the Mississippi House of Representatives and the Mississippi Senate

References

Census-designated places in Mississippi
Census-designated places in Lafayette County, Mississippi
Mississippi placenames of Native American origin